An elephant sword, also called a tusk sword, is an edged weapon designed to be attached to the tip of an elephant's tusk, normally used in pairs.

War elephants were used for centuries, primarily from India to the Middle East, and were often armored. Made of iron or steel, elephant swords were probably used from a relatively early date. Over a thousand years ago, elephants equipped with steel-tipped tusks were reportedly effectively used in battle. An elephant could toss an enemy in the air and cut him in two. Sometimes the blades were coated with poison. The Russian merchant Afanasii Nikitin recorded the use of these weapons in India in the 15th century.  A Persian illustration titled "The Battle of Pashan Begins" from the Shahnama (Book of Kings) of Shah Tahmasp, from Tabriz circa 1530s, shows an elephant in battle equipped with elephant swords (the battle depicted occurred centuries earlier).

It is possible that as many as thousands of elephant swords were manufactured over the years, but only four pairs plus a single specimen are known to exist today.

References

Swords
Elephants
Military history of India
Livestock